, also known as Crimehunter – Bullet of Fury, is a 1989 Japanese original video action film directed by Toshimichi Okawa. It was released on March 10, 1989.

Cast
Masanori Sera as Joe
Minako Tanaka as Lily
Riki Takeuchi
Ryuji Katagiri
Seiji Matano as Bruce
Takashi Hunt
Yoshio Harada

Reception
On Midnight Eye, Tom Mes said that "thanks to giving the Japanese film industry a much-needed shot in the arm by kick-starting the V-cinema movement, [the film] holds undeniable historical value".

References

1989 action films
1989 films
1989 direct-to-video films
Direct-to-video action films
Japanese action films
Japanese direct-to-video films
1980s Japanese films